Richardson-Bates House is a historic home located at Oswego in Oswego County, New York. It is constructed primarily of brick and built in two stages. The main section is a -story, Tuscan Villa style brick residence with a gable roof and 4-story tower designed by architect Andrew Jackson Warner about 1867. The interior features carved woodwork by Louis Lavonier. The South wing addition included a private library, formal dining room and kitchen that was completed in 1889.

The house and its contents were donated to the Oswego Historical Society in 1947. It was listed on the National Register of Historic Places in 1975.

References

External links
Richardson-Bates House Museum, City of Oswego
http://www.rbhousemuseum.org/

Houses on the National Register of Historic Places in New York (state)
Historic house museums in New York (state)
Houses completed in 1867
Museums in Oswego County, New York
Houses in Oswego County, New York
Oswego, New York
National Register of Historic Places in Oswego County, New York